Râfov is a commune in Prahova County, Muntenia, Romania. It is composed of nine villages: Antofiloaia, Buchilași, Buda, Goga, Mălăiești, Moara Domnească, Palanca, Râfov and Sicrita.

References

Communes in Prahova County
Localities in Muntenia
Place names of Slavic origin in Romania